Valentino Annibale Pastore (13 November 1868 - 27 February 1956) was an Italian philosopher and logician.

Pastore was born in Orbassano.

He studied literature at the University of Turin under Arturo Graf. His thesis La vita delle forme letterarie (The life of literary forms) was published in 1892 in Turin. Pastore then turned to philosophy, influenced by the works of Pasquale d'Ercole, Friedrich Kiesow, Antonio Garbasso, and Giuseppe Peano, publishing his own thesis Sopra le teorie della scienza: logica, matematica, fisica (On the theories of science: logic, mathematics, physics) in 1903.

He was professor in Turin from 1913 until 1939, leading a laboratory of "experimental logic". He eventually focused on logical aspects and procedures in science.

Pastore died in Turin.

Works 
 , 1903
 , 1906
 Del nuovo spirito della scienza e della filosofia, 1907
 Sillogismo e proporzione, 1910
 Dell'essere e del conoscere, 1911
 Il pensiero puro, 1913
 Il problema della causalitá, con particolare riguardo alla teoria del metodo sperimentale, 1921
 Il solipsismo, 1923
 La logica del potenziamento, 1936
 Logica sperimentale, 1939
 L'acrisia di Kant, 1940
 La filosofia di Lenin, 1946
 La volontá dell'assurdo. Storia e crisi dell'esistenzialismo, 1948
 Logicalia, 1957
 Dioniso, 1957
 Introduzione alla metafisica della poesia, 1957

External links 
 Biography
 Picture

1868 births
1956 deaths
19th-century essayists
19th-century Italian male writers
19th-century Italian philosophers
20th-century essayists
20th-century Italian male writers
20th-century Italian philosophers
Continental philosophers
Italian essayists
Italian logicians
Italian male non-fiction writers
Literary theorists
Philosophers of literature
Philosophers of logic
Philosophers of mathematics
Philosophers of science
Philosophy academics
Philosophy writers
University of Turin alumni
Academic staff of the University of Turin
People from Orbassano